Mosor, or Mount Mosor (Massarus Mons), is a mountain range in Croatia located near the city of Split on the Adriatic coast. It belongs to Dinaric Alps, and it stretches from the pass of Klis in the northwest to the Cetina River in the southeast.

The highest peak is the eponymous Mosor peak at 1,339 m.a.s.l. There are no inhabited areas on the mountain above 600 metres. Mosor is mainly composed of karst — limestone rocks.

It attracts mountaineers from Croatia. There are two alpine huts and many mountaineering paths on Mosor.

References

External links
 Croatian climbing club "Mosor" (Hrvatsko planinarsko društvo "Mosor") 

Mountain ranges of Croatia
Landforms of Split-Dalmatia County